Töreboda is a locality and the seat of Töreboda Municipality, Västra Götaland County, Sweden with 4,189 inhabitants in 2010. Every three years since 2000, a festival has been held at the beginning of July.   Töreboda is the hometown for worldwide famous punkband Asta Kask.

References 

Municipal seats of Västra Götaland County
Swedish municipal seats
Populated places in Västra Götaland County
Populated places in Töreboda Municipality